The Institute of Medical Science (Tokyo-daigaku Ikagaku Kenkyujyo 東京大学医科学研究所) is an ancillary establishment of Tokyo University.  It succeeded  established in 1892 and is the foremost institute for medical and bioscience research in Japan.

A research hospital is attached to the institute. The former Institute of Public Health was located on the site.

History 
1892: Dainihon Shiritu Eiseikai Fuzoku Densenbyo Kenkyujyo (Empire of Japan Private Sanitation Meeting Attachment Institute of Infectious Diseases) was established.
1899: It became the National Institute of Infectious Diseases under the jurisdiction of the Ministry of the Interior.
1914: The institute entered under the management of the Ministry of Education).
1916: It becomes an ancillary establishment of Tokyo Imperial University.
1967: Densenbyo Kenkyujyo (Institute of Infectious Diseases) was reorganized, then, Ikagaku Kenkyu-jyo (Institute of Medical Science) was established.

Organization 
Department of Microbiology and Immunology
Department of Cancer Biology
Department of Basic Medical Sciences
Donation Laboratories
Human Genome Center
Center for Experimental Medicine
The Advanced Clinical Research Center
International Research Center for Infectious

Research facilities

First Building
Photographic Laboratory (Prof. Jun-ichiro Inoue)
Research Hospital
Administration Office Project Accounting Office
Division of Molecular of Therapy (Prof. Arinobu Tojo)
Division of Medical Data Processing Network System (Prof. Tetsuo Shimizu)
Executive Project Coordination Office
Department of Advanced Medical Science (Prof. Naohide Yamashita)
Division of Infectious Diseases (Prof. Aikichi Iwamoto)
Division of Biochemistry (Associate Prof. Seiichi Takasaki)
Library
Director's Office (Prof. Naohide Yamashita)
Dean's Office (Prof. Motoharu Seiki)
Division of Bioengineering (Prof. Hideaki Tahara)
Division of Cellular Therapy (Associate Prof. Kohichiro Tsuji)
Division of Cellular Therapy (Prof. Toshio Kitamura)
Research Hospital

Second Building
Laboratory of Social Genome Sciences (Prof. Ichizo Kobayashi)
Division of Fine Morphology (Prof. Eisaku Katayama)

Third Building
Laboratory of Molecular Genetics (Prof. Izumu Saito)
Division of Oncology (Prof. Tadashi Yamamoto)
Laboratory of Functional Genomics (Prof. Sumio Sugano)
Division of Neuronal Network (Prof. Toshiya Manabe)
Department of Infectious Disease Control (Division of Microbial Infection) (Prof. Tetsuro Matano)
Department of Infectious Disease Control (Division of Viral Infection) (Associate Prof. Yasushi Kawaguchi)
Department of Infectious Disease Control (Division of Bacterial Infection) (Associate Prof. Ichiro Nakagawa)
B Common Laboratory (Prof. Chieko Kai)
Culture Media Section (Prof. Jun-ichiro Inoue)

Fourth Building
Division of Molecular Pathology (Prof. Yoshinori Murakami)
Division of Clinical Immunology (Prof. Chikao Morimoto)
Laboratory of Cell Biology (Prof. Yoichiro Iwakura)
Division of Host-Parasite Interaction (Prof. Hideo Iba)
Division of Infectious Genetics (Prof. Kensuke Miyake)
Radioisotope laboratories (Prof. IWAKURA Yoichiro Iwakura)
Radioisotope laboratories

Clinical Research Building A
Division of Cell Processing (CERES) ((Visiting) Prof. Tsuneo Takahashi)
Cord blood bank

Clinical Research Building B
Div. Hematopoietic Factors Chugai (Head: Toshio Kitamura)

Research Building (annex)

Open Laboratory Building
Division of Molecular and Developmental Biology (Oriental･Tomy･Softbank) (Prof.(Visiting) Sumiko Watanabe)
Division of Stem Cell Engineering (Tooth Regeneration) (Prof. (Visiting) Minoru Ueda)
Division of Exploratory Research (Ain Pharmaciez) (Associate Prof. (Visiting) Masahiro Kami)

The Core Facility for Therapeutic Vectors

The Scintiscanner room

General Research Building
Laboratory of DNA Information Analysis (Prof. Satoru Miyano)
Laboratory of Molecular Medicine (Prof. Yusuke Nakamura)
Laboratory of Functional Analysis in silico (Prof. Kenta Nakai)
Laboratory of Genome Technology (Associate Prof. Toyomasa Katagiri)
Division of Cancer Cell Research (Prof. Motoharu Seiki)
Division of Molecular Biology (Prof. Yoshikazu Nakamura)
Division of Mucosal Immunology (Prof. Hiroshi Kiyono)
Division of Molecular Cell Signaling (Prof. Haruo Saito)
Division of Bacterial Infection (Prof. Chihiro Sasakawa)
Division of Virology (Prof. Yoshihiro Kawaoka )
Pathogenic Microbes Repository Unit (Prof. Chihiro Sasakawa)
Laboratory Animal Research Center (Prof. Chieko Kai)
Laboratory of Stem Cell Therapy (Prof. Hiromitsu Nakauchi)
Division of Cellular and Molecular Biology (Prof. Jun-ichiro Inoue)
Laboratory of Gene Expression and Regulation  (Prof. Nobuaki Yoshida)

Human Genome Center
Laboratory of Genome Database (Prof. Minoru Kanehisa)
Laboratory of Sequence Analysis
Department of Public Policy (Associate Prof. Kaori Mutou)
Laboratory of Functional Genomics  (Prof. Mark Lathrop, Associate Prof. Masao Nagasaki)
RIKEN SNP Research Center
Radioisotope Control Room Super Computer Room
Radioisotope laboratories (Human Genome Center) (Prof. Yusuke Nakamura)
Radioisotope Laboratory

Human Genome Center (annex)

Animal Center
Its gross area is 3.800 m2

Clinical center 
Hospital Building A　(New Hospital Building)
Hospital Building B (Clinical Center)
Surgical Center Medical Supply Center
Cell Processing and Transfusion Dialysis room Applied Genomics
Laboratory Medicine
Hospital Building C (MRI Facility)

Adjunct facilities
Amgen Hall
This structure was donated from Amgen to the Institute of Medical Science to support medical science research. It contains a main conference room, a smaller conference room, and a laboratory for Tumor Cell Biology  (Prof. Toshiki Watanabe)
Crest Hall
International Hall
Shirokane Hall
Medical Science Museum

See also
Constructions of the University of Tokyo
National Institute of Public Health of Japan

Inner links

Campuses of other Global 30 in Japan
Campus of the University of Tokyo
Campus of Keio University
Campus of Kyushu University

External links
The Institute of Medical Science, The University of Tokyo

References

University of Tokyo
Super Global Universities